Bhakti Prajnan Keshava (9 February 1898 – 6 October 1968), addressed by the honorific Mahārāja,  was a Gaudiya Vaishnava guru, disciple of Bhaktisiddhanta Sarasvati and the founder-acharya of the religious organisation "Sri Gaudiya Vedanta Samiti", formed in Calcutta in 1940, and its headquarters, monastery Sri Devananda Gaudiya Math in Nabadwip.

Bhakti Prajnan Keshava Maharaja and A. C. Bhaktivedanta Swami Prabhupada were godbrothers (disciples of the same spiritual master). Abhay Charanaravinda Prabhu became A. C. Bhaktivedanta Swami (taking the title "Bhaktivedanta" and name Swāmī) when Keśava Gosvāmī initiated him into the renounced order of life (sannyasa) on 17 September 1959 at Keshava Maharaja's temple in Mathura.

References

Bibliography

External links

20th-century Hindu religious leaders
Indian Hindu religious leaders
Gaudiya religious leaders
Bengali Hindus
Indian Hare Krishnas
Presidents of religious organizations
1898 births
1968 deaths
Bengali Hindu saints
Bengali philosophers
20th-century Bengalis
People from Nadia district
Scholars from West Bengal